Tyler Shelast (born December 26, 1984) is a Canadian former professional ice hockey player who last played for the Kalamazoo Wings in the ECHL.

Undrafted after a collegiate career with Michigan Tech of the Western Collegiate Hockey Association, on March 20, 2008, the Dallas Stars of the National Hockey League signed Shelast to a two-year entry-level contract.

Following the 2009–10 season within the Stars minor league affiliates, Shelast did not receive a qualifying offer from the club, allowing him to become an unrestricted free agent on July 1, 2010.

Currently, Shelast is serving as the Strength & Conditioning Coach for the Michigan Technological University (Houghton, MI) varsity hockey team.

Career statistics

References

External links

1984 births
Canadian ice hockey right wingers
Evansville IceMen players
Florida Everblades players
Greenville Road Warriors players
Hamilton Bulldogs (AHL) players
Ice hockey people from British Columbia
Idaho Steelheads (ECHL) players
Iowa Stars players
Kalamazoo Wings (ECHL) players
Living people
Michigan Tech Huskies men's ice hockey players
Quad City Mallards (CHL) players
South Carolina Stingrays players
Sportspeople from Kelowna
Stockton Thunder players
Texas Stars players
Trenton Titans players
Salmon Arm Silverbacks players
Powell River Kings players
Allen Americans players